Copenhagen Cowboy is a supernatural noir-thriller television series created by Nicolas Winding Refn for Netflix. The first Danish-language work by Refn since Pusher 3 (2005), it follows Miu (Angela Bundalovic), a renegade with various psychic abilities who goes on an unknown quest on the Copenhagen's criminal underworld .

Series overview 
A young enigmatic renegade named Miu, rumored to be a psychic that brings luck to her surroundings, revisits Copenhagen with an unknown motive. Navigating its criminal underworld, Miu encounters various adversaries, supernatural and otherwise, while meeting various individuals she grows to care about. Miu eventually encounters a threatening presence, Rakel, who has similar powers to her own.

Cast

Main 
 Angela Bundalovic as Miu, a young mysterious psychic rumored to bring good luck.
 Liv Corfixen as older version of Miu.
 Lizzielou Corfixen as younger version of Miu.
 Neesha Dewa, Rahel Meconen, Lea Bach Nielsen, Isabella Kjær Westermann, Rose-Maria Kjær Westermann, Vigga Nue Møller plays other versions of Miu respectively. 
 Andreas Lykke Jørgensen as Nicklas, a malicious young man who comes from a mysterious and affluent family, who is gifted with spiritual powers.
 Lola Corfixen as Rakel, Nicklas' "sister" who has similar abilities as Miu.
 LiIi Zhang as Jang a.k.a. "Mother Hulda", owner of a Chinese diner named "Dragon Palace".
 Jason Hendil-Forssell as Mr. Chiang, a notorious gang leader and casino owner who uses Dragon Palace as a body disposal site.
 Zlatko Burić as Miroslav, an independent lawyer who serves Copenhagen criminals as clients and has had prior contacts with Miu.
 Valentina Dejanovic as Cimona, a female prostitute who befriends Miu.
 Ramadan Huseini as André, an Albanian pimp who runs a brothel under the pretense of a "modeling agency".
 Dragana Milutinović as Rosella, a superstitious Serbian half-sister of André who houses his prostitutes.

Recurring 
 Adam Buschard as Aske, a professional hunter who is a loyal servant of Nicklas' family.
 Maria Erwolter as Beate, Nicklas' affluent and overindulging mother.
 Thomas Algren as Michael, Nicklas' affluent and narcissistic father.
 Leif Sylvester as Arne, Hulda's regular customer who is a pigfarmer.
 Emilie Xin Tong Han as Ai, Hulda's daughter who Chiang took away from her as a collateral.
 Hok Kit Cheng as Ying, Mr. Chiang's second-in-command who often accompanies him.
 Slavko Labović as Dusan, Miroslav's old friend who often shows brash personality.
 Ebiriama Jaiteh as Danny, a meticulous facilitator of a drug dealing gang.
 Nicki Dirschen Hansen as Polixen, Miroslav's contact who is member of a drug dealing gang.
 Gustav Hejlesen as Bjarke, Miroslav's contact who is a member of a drug dealing gang.
 Dafina Zeqiri as Flora, André's 18 year-old daughter.
 Fleur Frilund as Jessica, Flora's friend who is one of Miroslav's clients.
 Per Thiim Thim as Sven, Rosella's husband through an arranged marriage.
 Daniel Sami Strandet as Dardan, one of André's henchmen.
 Thjerza Balaj as Ljiliana, one of André's prostitutes.
 Sandra Vukicevic as Mima, one of André's prostitutes.

Guest 
 Nicolas Winding Refn as Jørgen, one of the drug dealing clients whom Miu meets.
 Mads Brügger as Jonas, one of the drug dealing clients whom Miu meets.
 Mikael Bertelsen as Steen, one of the drug dealing clients whom Miu meets.
 Hideo Kojima as Hideo, a fictionalized version of himself who is one of Miroslav's associates.
 Lina Brink Jakobsen as My Kin, Hulda's associate who provides new identities for Golden Dragon's employee.
 Dragana Dan as Mihaela, Rosella's friend who works as a seer.
 Ruiqi Xu as an unnamed pregnant woman.

Episodes

Production

Development 
On July 22, 2022, Netflix commissioned Copenhagen Cowboy as a part of Danish Netflix original series. Refn is set to direct and executive-produce the series through his own production company, byNWR. Joining him as producers are Lene Børglum and Christina Bostofte Erritzøe. Sara Isabella Jönsson, Johanne Algren and Mona Masri were attached to write the series. On September 9, 2022, it was revealed that Liv Corfixen would also produce.

Casting 
On July 22, 2022, it was revealed that Angela Bundalovic was cast in the leading role, along with Fleur Frilund, Lola Corfixen, Zlatko Burić, Andreas Lykke Jørgensen, Jason Hendil-Forssell, Li Ii Zhang, Dragana Milutinović, Mikael Bertelsen, Mads Brügger, Ramadan Huseini, and Per Thiim Thim.

Filming 
It was revealed that the principal photography of the series had already begun in Copenhagen, Denmark since 2021 through Refn's social media accounts. It wrapped on early April 2022, according to NWR's socials. Magnus Nordenhof Jønck was director of photography. Series editors were revealed on September 4, 2022, with Matthew Newman, Olivier Bugge Coutté, Olivia Neergaard-Holm, Allan Funch joining the post-production team.

Controversy

Animal abuse allegations 
PETA filed a complaint on December 9, 2021, accusing Copenhagen Cowboy production team of killing pigs during the filming process. It was revealed that they had a farmer that supplied pigs for the series, who in turn witnessed a pig shot and killed specifically for a scene. The death was confirmed by a Copenhagen Zoo correspondent and therefore brought an investigation by Danish police. PETA sent a letter to Reed Hastings, requesting the production team to cut a scene where the pigs are shot on the set.

Release 
Copenhagen Cowboy first premiered in Venice Film Festival on September 9, 2022. The series was released on the platform on January 5, 2023.

A making-of documentary titled Copenhagen Cowboy: Nightcall with Nicolas Winding Refn arrived on Netflix on January 31, 2023.

Marketing 
The first trailer of the series was released on YouTube on September 4, 2022. Second trailer was released on November 23, 2022.

Critical reception 

On Rotten Tomatoes, the first season holds an approval rating of 67% based on 24 reviews, with an average rating of 6.40/10.The website's critical consensus reads, "Beautiful and mystifying as an art installation, Copenhagen Cowboy follows in Nicolas Winding Refn's polarizing tradition of glacially-paced crime thrillers that exude stylish cool."

Jonathon Wilson of Ready Steady Cut gave the series 4/5 stars, praising Bundalovic's performance and the direction, writing "...in the limitless potential of its ideas and the striking strangeness of its execution, it’ll live in the memories of everyone who watches it." Jasper Rees of The Daily Telegraph gave the series 3/5 stars, praising Bundalovic's performance, although criticizing its plot and direction, writing"It has no idea how to end other than to shrug and raise a single, massively irritating digit in the direction of the viewer." Charles Bramesco of The Guardian gave the series 3/5 stars, praising its cinematography, score, and symbolism while also criticizing its writing and direction, writing "Refn delivers something we’ve never seen before only after spending hours on more of the same, a slog leavened by scant enjoyments."  Angie Han of The Hollywood Reporter similarly praised the cinematography while criticizing its plot, writing, "the project feels less like an intricately plotted Marvel blockbuster than some half-forgotten fairy tale." 

Brian Tallerico from RogerEbert.com gave the series 2/4 stars, claiming that "Most of the ideas in Copenhagen Cowboy are underdeveloped, and Refn is repeating more than he is reinventing." Rafaela Sales Ross of The Playlist gave the series a C+ grade, saying "[I]f one is ever so inclined to indulge the filmmaker's predilection for the self-congratulatory, then Copenhagen Cowboy will work a treat. If the opposite is true, then buckle up, as this is about to be one wild yet extremely unpleasant ride." Austen Goslin of Polygon wrote, "Refn misses about as often as he hits in Copenhagen Cowboy — even if a few of those hits are home runs." Steph Green of Sight & Sound shared a similar opinion, writing, "Copenhagen Cowboy will be manna for those partial to Refn's acidic, arcane films ... it's an overly languid journey, however visually striking it may be."

References

External links
 
 

2023 Danish television series debuts
2020s Danish television series
Cannibalism in fiction
Copenhagen in fiction
Cultural depictions of gangsters
Chinese-language television shows
Danish action television series
Danish-language Netflix original programming
Hive minds in fiction
Prostitution in television
Superstitions
Thriller television series
Television series about illegal drug trade
Television series about organized crime
Television shows about psychic powers
Television shows set in Denmark
2022 Danish television series debuts